The Polk Creek Shale is a Late Ordovician geologic formation in the Ouachita Mountains of Arkansas and Oklahoma. First described in 1892, this unit was not named until 1909 by Albert Homer Purdue in his study of the Ouachita Mountains of Arkansas.  Purdue assigned Polk Creek in Montgomery County, Arkansas as the type locality, but did not designate a stratotype. As of 2017, a reference section for this unit has yet to be designated.

Paleofauna

Graptolites

 Amplexograptus
 Climacograptus
 C. mississippiensis
 C. putillus
 C. tridentatus var. maximus
 C. ulrichi
 Dicellograptus
 D. anceps
 D. complanatus
 D. elegans
 D. forehammeri flexuosus
 Diplograptus
 D. calcaratus
 D. calcaratus var. trifidus
 D. crassitestus
 Glossograptus
 G. quadrimucronatus
 G. quadrimucronatus var. paucithecatus
 Lasiograptus
 Mesograptus
 Nymphograptus
 N. velatus
 Orthograptus
 O. quadrimucronatus
 O. spinigerus

See also

 List of fossiliferous stratigraphic units in Arkansas
 Paleontology in Arkansas

References

Ordovician geology of Oklahoma
Ordovician Arkansas
Ordovician southern paleotropical deposits